Loma Prieta (translates to "Dark Hill") is an American hardcore punk band that formed in 2005. The group is based in San Francisco, California and derived their name from the 1989 Loma Prieta earthquake. Most of the group's early material was released on their own record label named Discos Huelga. Loma Prieta has toured the US, Mexico, Canada, Europe and Japan. They share members with Punch. Their often dark and emotionally charged music blends a range of styles, most prominently screamo and powerviolence.

In June 2011, Loma Prieta recorded music for their fourth studio album with Jack Shirley. Their signing to Deathwish Inc. was announced in October 2011, and released their fourth studio album, titled I.V., through their new label on January 17, 2012. The album received positive reviews from AbsolutePunk, Alternative Press, and Exclaim!. Two music videos, for the songs "Fly by Night" and "Trilogy 4 - Momentary", have been released to promote I.V. In support of I.V., Loma Prieta toured New Zealand and Australia in January 2012, the United States with Birds in Row in March 2012 and North America with Converge and Git Some in April 2012. The band recorded and released a split with Raein in 2013.

On October 2, 2015, Loma Prieta released their fifth full-length studio album titled Self Portrait. The album was described as being a more "literal" and positive album lyrically as opposed to being more "opaque" and angry on previous albums, while sonically Loma Prieta incorporates more melody while retaining the same level of hardcore intensity. To promote the album, the band released a single for the album's opening track "Love" backed with and exclusive B-side titled "Trilogy 0 (Debris)". They also released a music video for "Love" in September 2015.

Members

Current
 Sean Leary – guitar, vocals (2005-present)
 Brian Kanagaki – guitar, vocals (2008-present)
 Val Saucedo – drums (2005-present)
 James Siboni – bass guitar

Former
 Derrick Chao – guitar
 David Fung – vocals, guitar (2005-2007)
 Jake Spek – bass guitar

Discography

Studio albums
 Last City (2008)
 Dark Mountain (2009)
 Life/Less (2010)
 I.V. (2012)
 Self Portrait (2015)

Extended plays
 Our LP Is Your EP (2006)
 Matrimony (2007)
 Loma Prieta / Raein (split with Raein) (2013)

Singles
 "Love"/"Trilogy 0 (Debris)" (2015)
 "Continuum"/"Fate" (2020)

Music videos
 "Trilogy 4 'Momentary'" (2011)
 "Fly by Night" (2012)
 "Love" (2015)

References

External links
 
 Loma Prieta on Deathwish Inc.
 Loma Prieta discography on Discogs
 Loma Prieta discography on Rate Your Music

Deathwish Inc. artists
Musical groups established in 2005
2005 establishments in California
Musical groups from San Francisco
Hardcore punk groups from California
Punk rock groups from California
American screamo musical groups
Emo revival groups
Powerviolence groups
Musical quartets